The 2007 Buffalo Bulls football team represented the University at Buffalo in the 2007 NCAA Division I FBS football season.  The team played in the East Division of the Mid-American Conference.

Schedule

NFL selections
For the first time in the history of the UB Football team, 3 players from the 2007 football team signed for NFL teams.  Trevor Scott and Jamey Richard were drafted by the Oakland Raiders and Indianapolis Colts respectively, while punter Ben Woods signed a free agent contract with the Cleveland Browns.

References

Buffalo
Buffalo Bulls football seasons
Buffalo Bulls football